Jürgen Schmitt is a German astronomer and physicist at the University of Hamburg, where he is a professor of astrophysics. He is significant in the fields of X-ray astronomy and stellar activity because of his discoveries regarding CN Leonis, a cool star 8 light years away from Earth.

References

German astrophysicists
Academic staff of the University of Hamburg
Harvard University alumni
Year of birth missing (living people)
Living people